Akko is a genus of gobies native to the Atlantic and Pacific coasts of the Americas.

Species
This genus contains three species:
 Akko brevis (Günther, 1864)
 Akko dionaea Birdsong & C. R. Robins, 1995
 Akko rossi Van Tassell & C. C. Baldwin, 2004

References

Gobiidae